Love Is the Law is an album by the American New wave band The Suburbs, released in 1984.

Reception

Writing for Allmusic, music critic Vince Ripol wrote that the album "concentrates [the Suburbs'] alternative dance-rock into a single-length showcase of their strengths... In general, Love Is the Law is harder and tighter than previous releases, and even the most intense tracks produce lingering melodies in the wake of relentless rock & roll. The Suburbs may not have equaled the success or longevity of other Minneapolis musicians from the 1980s, but Love Is the Law holds its own against the more celebrated albums of its time."

The album cover includes a reproduction of Édouard Manet's "The Dead Toreador", which the band had seen on display at the National Gallery of Art in Washington, D.C. In an interview with Cashbox magazine, Chan Poling said that the band liked the ironic juxtaposition of the album's themes of warmth and love with the coldness of an image of a man lying dead.

Track listing
All songs composed by The Suburbs.
"Love Is the Law" – 4:44
"Monster Man" – 3:18
"Rattle My Bones" – 3:28
"Skin" – 4:24
"Accept Me Baby" – 3:47
"Hell A" – 4:32
"Perfect Communist" – 5:07
"Rainy Day" – 5:02
"Crazy Job" – 5:07

Personnel
 Chan Poling – keyboards, vocals
 Beej Chaney – vocals
 Hugo Klaers – drums
 Bruce Allen – guitar, vocals
 Michael Halliday – bass
 Terry Paul – vocals
 Tom Burnevik – saxophone
 Scott Snyder – trumpet

Production notes
Steven Greenberg – producer, engineer
Paul Stark – producer, engineer
Howie Weinberg – mastering
Robert Hadley – digital remastering
Édouard Manet – cover painting
Laurie Allen – photography

References

External links
  The album page on the Twin/Tone website.

1984 albums
The Suburbs albums
PolyGram albums